Pseudonotoncus is a genus of ants in the subfamily Formicinae. The genus is known only from forested areas on the east coast of Australia.

Species
 Pseudonotoncus eurysikos Shattuck & O'Reilly, 2013
 Pseudonotoncus hirsutus Clark, 1934

References

External links

Formicinae
Ant genera
Hymenoptera of Australia